Thomas Joseph Hitchcock (born 1 October 1992) is an English footballer who plays as a forward for Cambridge City.

Club career

Blackburn Rovers
Hitchcock progressed through the youth system at Blackburn Rovers academy after officially joining in 2007, after being recommended by his father Kevin Hitchcock who was then goalkeeping coach at the club. He made his breakthrough into the Blackburn Rovers reserve team in 2009, scoring his first goal that year.

On 19 July 2011, following a successful pre-season trial, Hitchcock joined then League Two side Plymouth Argyle on an initial three-month loan, eventually making 10 appearances for the club before returning to his parent club.

On 2 February 2012, Hitchcock became a free agent following the mutual cancellation of his contract with Blackburn.

Queens Park Rangers
On 4 March 2012 Hitchcock signed a one-year deal with Queens Park Rangers. On 17 August 2013, Hitchcock made his debut for the club as an 83rd-minute substitute for Bobby Zamora, scoring a 90th-minute winner in a 1–0 win over Ipswich Town.

Following limited first team opportunities, Hitchcock signed on loan for League One side Crewe Alexandra. He went on to make 6 appearances for the club, scoring 3 goals.

On 10 January 2014, Tom joined Rotherham United on a month-long loan. He scored his first goal for the club on his second appearance, opening the scoring in a 3–0 win against Shrewsbury Town. On 5 April, he scored his first professional career hat-trick in a 4–3 win against Gillingham.

Milton Keynes Dons
On 1 July 2014, Hitchcock joined Milton Keynes Dons on a three-year contract following his release from Queens Park Rangers.

On 31 October 2014, Hitchcock signed on loan for Fleetwood Town, and scored just three minutes into his debut in a 1–0 win against Gillingham. He went on to make seven appearances for the club, before returning to Milton Keynes Dons in January 2015.

On 7 August 2015, Hitchcock signed for League Two side Stevenage, initially on a one-month loan which was later extended. Hitchcock made his debut for Stevenage  against Notts County but was sent off on his debut. Hitchcock scored his first goal for Stevenage in a 1–1 away draw to Dagenham & Redbridge. Hitchcock scored his second goal for the club on 19 September 2015 in a 3–2 away defeat to Barnet before returning to Milton Keynes Dons. On 23 February 2016, Hitchcock returned to League One side Crewe Alexandra on loan for the rest of the 2015–16 season.

On 9 August 2016, Hitchcock left Milton Keynes Dons, becoming a free agent following the mutual termination of his contract. He joined Port Vale on trial in January 2017.

Non-league

On 11 September 2017, Hitchcock signed for Chelmsford City.

Following departing Chelmsford in March 2018, Hitchcock joined Biggleswade Town on 31 August 2018. He then joined Chesham United and Harlow Town in quick succession. Hitchcock joined Cheshunt at the start of the 2019–20 season, before joining Bedford Town. Hitchcock signed for Cambridge City for the 2021–22 season, having played for the Lilywhites on loan the previous year.

Personal life
Hitchcock is the son of former Chelsea goalkeeper Kevin Hitchcock. While attending Kingshott School in Hitchin, he was a member of the Watford academy along with classmate Ben Nugent, combining his studies and appearances for the school's first XI with his Academy commitments. When his father was appointed as goalkeeping coach at Blackburn Rovers as part of Mark Hughes' coaching team in 2004, Hitchcock and his family moved north and Tom transferred to the Blackburn youth teams.

Career statistics

References

External links

1992 births
Blackburn Rovers F.C. players
Bristol Rovers F.C. players
Crewe Alexandra F.C. players
English footballers
Fleetwood Town F.C. players
Footballers from Hertfordshire
Sportspeople from Hemel Hempstead
Living people
Milton Keynes Dons F.C. players
Plymouth Argyle F.C. players
Queens Park Rangers F.C. players
Rotherham United F.C. players
Boreham Wood F.C. players
Chelmsford City F.C. players
Biggleswade Town F.C. players
Chesham United F.C. players
Harlow Town F.C. players
Cheshunt F.C. players
Bedford Town F.C. players
Cambridge City F.C. players
English Football League players
National League (English football) players
Southern Football League players
Isthmian League players
Northern Premier League players
Association football forwards